In Greek mythology, the name Hemithea (Ancient Greek: Ἡμιθέα "demigoddess") refers to:

 Hemithea, originally named Molpadia, daughter of Staphylus and Chrysothemis, sister of Parthenos and Rhoeo. According to Diodorus Siculus, she and Parthenos were put in charge of watching after their father's wine but fell asleep while performing this duty, and while they were asleep, the wine jar was broken by the swine their family kept. When the sisters woke up, they saw what had happened. In fear of their father's wrath, threw themselves off a cliff both muttering the name of Apollo. Apollo, who was in love with Rhoeo, would not let her sisters die and granted both of them immortality. Molpadia's name was changed to Hemithea upon her deification. Parthenius makes Hemithea mother of Basileus by Lyrcus; in his version of the story, Hemithea apparently had this name since birth and nothing is said of her deification; however, Staphylus and his daughters' home is located in Bubastus, right where Hemithea came to be worshipped in Diodorus' account.
 Hemithea, also known as Amphithea or Leucothea, the sister of Tenes, who was placed into a chest and set into the sea together with her brother. They landed on an island which was later named Tenedos, of which Tenes became king. Tenes ended his life in a battle with Achilles, who then attempted to rape Hemithea. She ran off to escape him and was swallowed up in a chasm of the earth.

Notes

References 

 Conon, Fifty Narrations, surviving as one-paragraph summaries in the Bibliotheca (Library) of Photius, Patriarch of Constantinople translated from the Greek by Brady Kiesling. Online version at the Topos Text Project.
 Diodorus Siculus, The Library of History translated by Charles Henry Oldfather. Twelve volumes. Loeb Classical Library. Cambridge, Massachusetts: Harvard University Press; London: William Heinemann, Ltd. 1989. Vol. 3. Books 4.59–8. Online version at Bill Thayer's Web Site
 Diodorus Siculus, Bibliotheca Historica. Vol 1-2. Immanel Bekker. Ludwig Dindorf. Friedrich Vogel. in aedibus B. G. Teubneri. Leipzig. 1888-1890. Greek text available at the Perseus Digital Library.
 Parthenius, Love Romances translated by Sir Stephen Gaselee (1882-1943), S. Loeb Classical Library Volume 69. Cambridge, MA. Harvard University Press. 1916.  Online version at the Topos Text Project.
 Parthenius, Erotici Scriptores Graeci, Vol. 1. Rudolf Hercher. in aedibus B. G. Teubneri. Leipzig. 1858. Greek text available at the Perseus Digital Library.
 Pseudo-Apollodorus, The Library with an English Translation by Sir James George Frazer, F.B.A., F.R.S. in 2 Volumes, Cambridge, MA, Harvard University Press; London, William Heinemann Ltd. 1921. . Online version at the Perseus Digital Library. Greek text available from the same website.
 Stephanus of Byzantium, Stephani Byzantii Ethnicorum quae supersunt, edited by August Meineike (1790-1870), published 1849. A few entries from this important ancient handbook of place names have been translated by Brady Kiesling. Online version at the Topos Text Project.

Women in Greek mythology
Tenedos
Deeds of Apollo